The last four stages of the 2009 Copa Sudamericana de Clubes are the Round of 16, Quarterfinals, Semifinals, and Finals.

Bracket

Seeding
Teams from the Round of 16 onwards were seeded depending on which First Stage qualifier they won (ex: the winner of First Stage Qualifier O1 were given the 1 seed). The lower seeded team will play the first leg at home.

Round of 16 
The first leg of the Round of 16 was played from September 22 to September 24. The second leg was played from September 30 to October 1. Team #1 played the first leg at home.

|}

Match A

Cerro Porteño advanced on away goals.

Match B

Vélez Sarsfield advanced 4–1 on points.

Match C

River Plate advanced 4–1 on points.

Match D

Universidad de Chile advanced 4–1 on points.

Match E

Fluminense advanced 4–1 on points.

Match F

San Lorenzo advanced 6–0 on points.

Match G

LDU Quito advanced 4–1 on points.

Match H

Botafogo advanced on goal difference.

Quarterfinals 
The first leg of the Quarterfinals was played from October 20–22. The second leg was played from November 4–5. Team #1 played the first leg at home.

|}

Match S1

Cerro Porteño advanced 6–0 on points.

Match S2

LDU Quito advanced 4–1 on points.

Match S3

River Plate and San Lorenzo tied on points and goal difference. River Plate advanced 7–6 on penalties.

Match S4

Fluminense advanced 4–1 on points.

Semifinals 
The first leg of the Semifinals was played from November 11–12. The second leg was played from November 18–19. Team #1 played the first leg at home.

|}

Match F1

Fluminense advanced 6–0 on points.

Match F2

LDU Quito advanced on goal difference.

Finals

The finals were played on November 25 and December 2. 

|}

LDU Quito won on goal difference.

References

External links

Final stages